Mistletone is an Australian independent record label, tour promoter, booking agency and publicity company founded in 2006 by Ash and Sophie Miles.

Label roster

Current

 Avey Tare
 Bachelorette
 The Bats
 Beach House
 Cash Savage and the Last Drinks
 Daughn Gibson
 Early Woman
 El Guincho
 HTRK
 Jessica Pratt
 Jonti
 Julianna Barwick
 Kes
 La Sera
 Les Sins
 Luluc
 Montero
 The Orbweavers
 Panda Bear
 Purling Hiss
 Ramona Lisa
 Robert Scott
 Ross McLennan
 Steve Gunn
 Teen
 Toro y Moi
 Wintercoats

Alumni

 Ariel Pink
 Beaches
 Black Dice
 Coconot
 Curse ov Dialect
 Dan Deacon
 Dent May & His Magnificent Ukulele
 Evangelicals
 Francis Plagne
 High Places
 Lawrence Arabia
 Lucky Dragons
 Mark Barrage
 My Disco
 Marnie Stern
 Panel of Judges
 Prince Rama
 Vivian Girls

See also
 List of record labels

References

External links
 Official Mistletone website

Australian independent record labels
Indie rock record labels
Record labels established in 2006